Holban is a surname. Notable people with the surname include:

Anton Holban (1902–1937), Romanian novelist
Ștefan Holban (1869–1939), Romanian general and politician